Aram Banu Begum (22 December 1584 - 17 June 1624) was a Mughal Princess, the youngest daughter of the third Mughal Emperor Akbar.

Life 

Born on 22 December 1584, Aram Banu Begum was the youngest daughter of Akbar and  Bibi Daulat Shad. She also had a full sister, Shakr-un-nissa Begum.

She was very outspoken and mischievous. She was called the butterfly of the harem. She was fondly called Ladli Begum by Akbar. She is believed to be quick-witted and sharp at answering back. According to Jahangir, Akbar was extremely fond of her and described her impoliteness as politeness.

Akbar also repeatedly told Jahangir to “Bābā! for my sake be as kind as I am, after me, to this sister, who in Hindi phrase is my darling (that is, dearly cherished). Be affectionate to her and pass over her little impolitenesses and impudences.”

Death 
Aram Banu remained unmarried and died during the reign of her brother, Jahangir. She died of dysentery on 17 June 1624.

Reference 

Mughal princesses 
1584 births
1624 deaths
Timurid princesses 
16th-century Indian Muslims
17th-century Indian Muslims
16th-century Indian women
17th-century Indian women
Daughters of emperors